were Japanese monks from Mount Kōya who were sent to preach Buddhism around the country. They were the lowest caste inside the priests' hierarchy of the Mount Kōya temples, and traveled while peddling for a living.

Former monks who turned to mischief were called . Moreover,  also eventually became a seasonal word (in the context of poetry) for turtles.

See also
Hijiri zaka

References

Shingon Buddhism
Japanese Vajrayana Buddhism
Japanese Buddhist clergy
History of Buddhism in Japan